One Embarcadero Center is a class-A office skyscraper in the Financial District of San Francisco, California. The building is part of the Embarcadero Center complex of six interconnected buildings and one off-site extension. One Embarcadero Center is the second-tallest building out of the entire complex, standing one foot shorter than Four Embarcadero Center, which is the tallest in the complex. 

As of 2021, Boston Properties owns the building.

Part of Francis Ford Coppola's The Conversation was filmed in One Embarcadaro. The Laughing Policeman starring Walter Matthau and Bruce Dern also was filmed at One Embarcadero Center.

See also

List of tallest buildings in San Francisco

References

Office buildings completed in 1971
Skyscraper office buildings in San Francisco
John C. Portman Jr. buildings
Twin towers
Financial District, San Francisco